Mogoya is the fifth studio album by Maliian singer-songwriter Oumou Sangaré. It was released on 19 May 2017.

Critical reception
Mojo wrote that "musically, the key track here may be 'Kamelemba,' with keyboard washes beneath the hunter’s harp, the kamele n'goni, and subtle phasing added."

Track listing

Charts

References

2017 albums